The 2018 Philadelphia Union season was the club's ninth season in Major League Soccer, the top flight of American soccer. The team was managed by Jim Curtin, his fifth season with the club. The Union reached the MLS Cup Playoffs as the bottom seed in the MLS Eastern Conference. The club also reached the 2018 U.S. Open Cup final for the third time in club history, but finished runners-up to Houston Dynamo. The 2018 season was the Union's most successful to date, earning the highest points total (50) and most wins (15). Additionally, the 2018 season transitioned Sporting Directors with Earnie Stewart accepting a general manager position with the United States Soccer Federation, and the Union hiring Ernst Tanner; former academy manager for Red Bull Salzburg.

Background

MLS SuperDraft

The Union selected three players from the third and fourth rounds of the 2018 SuperDraft

Personnel

Roster 

DP indicates Designated Player
GA indicates Generation Adidas Player
HGP indicates Home Grown Player
INT indicates MLS International Player and qualifies for an international roster spot

Staff

Competitions

Preseason

MLS season

MLS Cup Playoffs

U.S. Open Cup

Friendlies

Standings

Eastern Conference

League standings

Results summary 

Position references Eastern Conference standings.

Statistics

Appearances and goals

|-
! colspan="12" style="background:#041C2C; color:#FFFFFF; border:2px solid #DFD1A7;" text-align:center;"| Defenders

|-
! colspan="12" style="background:#041C2C; color:#FFFFFF; border:2px solid #DFD1A7;" text-align:center;"| Midfielders

|-
! colspan="12" style="background:#041C2C; color:#FFFFFF; border:2px solid #DFD1A7;" text-align:center;"| Forwards

|}
Statistics are from all matches as documented by Soccerway.com.

Top scorers

Goalkeepers

Record = W-L-D

Transfers

In

Out

Loan in

Honors and awards

Retirement
In May 2018, long time Philadelphia Union forward Sebastian Le Toux announced his retirement from professional soccer. Making a name for himself as a top player for the Philadelphia Union, Le Toux signed a ceremonial one-day contract to retire as a Philadelphia player. His retirement ceremony was held on June 23, 2018 during a home match against Vancouver Whitecaps FC, where he was the first inductee into the Union's Ring of Honor.

References

External links
 Official Website
 Philadelphia Union at ESPN FC

Philadelphia Union seasons
Philadelphia Union
Philadelphia Union
Philadelphia Union